South Pacific Television (SPTV) was a television channel in New Zealand, which operated between 1976 and 1980.

History 
The channel, then known as TV2, first went to air on 30 June 1975. It was the second national government television channel to be established in the country that year, after Television One went to air on 1 April, replacing the former New Zealand Broadcasting Corporation's TV service.

In its first week, the network held New Zealand's first Telethon in aid of the St John Ambulance. It raised $593,878.

The channel could only be picked up in Auckland and Christchurch when it first went to air, but it was limited in Christchurch due to a faulty transmitter. It was another three months before the Waikato and Bay of Plenty got coverage and by late November, the channel was available in Wellington before spreading throughout the rest of the country.

In December 1976, TV2 was rebranded as South Pacific Television (SPTV) to distinguish itself from the former NZBC channel. It also reduced confusion in Auckland and Dunedin where Television One broadcast on channel 2 (TV2 broadcast on channel 4 in both centres).

In 1977, broadcasting hours were cut on both channels  and as a result SPTV lost 16 hours of broadcast time a week, forcing the channel to begin its daily broadcasts at 3pm (except weekends, where SPTV opened transmission at midday).

Channel funding was cut for Television One and handed over to SPTV in a move that bewildered some over at Television One. The effects of the cuts saw programme output on SPTV increase.

Fate
It was decided in 1979 by the National Government that the channels would be amalgamated under an administration which would end the competition that reared its head in 1975.

SPTV ended transmission on 15 February 1980 with a two-hour farewell special at 10.15pm.

The next day, 16 February 1980, Television One and SPTV were dissolved and became Television One and Television Two, under the newly formed Television New Zealand (TVNZ). A number of SPTV's programmes moved across to the new networks.

List of programmes

Domestic

Children's
 Chic Chat
 Chicaboom
 Child's Play
 Children of Fire Mountain
 Good Time Show with Tracy
 Hey, Hey It's Andy
 Hunter's Gold
 Romper Room (New Zealand version)

Comedy
 A Week of It
 Hudson and Halls
 Something to Look Forward to

Drama
 Castaways
 Colour Scheme
 Died in the Wool
 Hunter's Gold
 Ngaio Marsh Theatre
 Opening Night
 Radio Waves
  The Mackenzie Affair
 Vintage Murder

Entertainment
 The Club Show
 Opportunity Knocks
 Top of the World
 Telethon

Factual & Lifestyle
 Access
 Book Review
 Butcher's Hook
 Child Health
 Church in Action
 Farming Today
 Kaleidoscope
 Looking Your Best
 Pacific Viewpoint
 Pet Life
 Police Five
 Sew Easy
 Stars on Sunday
 Sunday's Child
 Talk Cars
 A Taste of the Orient
 That's Entertainment
 You and the Law
 Yours for the Asking

News and Current Affairs
 Eye Witness
 Forum
 News at Six
 News at Ten
 News Stand
 Weekend Edition News
 World Watch

Sport
 On the Mat
 Saturday Night Rugby
 Sportsworld

Overseas

Children's
 Batman
 Captain Caveman
 Clutch Cargo
 Dominic
 Doctor Who
 The Flintstones
 Michael Bentine's Potty Time
 The New Fred and Barney Show
 The Quick Draw McGraw Show
 Rainbow
 Rogue's Rock
 The Undersea Adventures of Captain Nemo

Comedy
 Alice
 The Bob Newhart Show
 The Brady Bunch
 Dave Allen at Large
 Doctor at Large
 Get Some In!
 Eight Is Enough
 Fantasy Island
 Gidget
 The Goodies
 The Liver Birds
 The Love Boat
 The Mike and Bernie Show
 Mixed Blessings
 My Three Sons
 Odd Man Out
 Oh No It's Selwyn Froggitt
 Please Sir!
 Porridge
 Soap
 The Stanley Baxter Moving Picture Show
 Sykes
 Taxi
 The Tony Randall Show
 Welcome Back, Kotter

Drama
 Against the Wind
 All Creatures Great and Small
 The Brothers
 Clayhanger
 Dan August
 Danger UXB
 The Duchess of Duke Street
 Emergency One
 Family (1976 TV series)
 Fantasy Island
 Hawaii Five-O
 The High Chaparral
 Kojak
 The Life and Times of Grizzly Adams
 Little House on the Prairie
 Man from Atlantis
 New Scotland Yard
 The Persuaders!
 The Professionals
 The Rookies
 Search for Tomorrow
 Softly, Softly: Taskforce
 Spearhead
 Spencer's Pilots
 The Sullivans
 Spearhead
 Within These Walls
 The Wild Wild West
 Wonder Woman

Entertainment
 Dinah!
 The Tom O'Connor Show

Factual
 The Incredible World of Adventure
 Wild Kingdom

References

External links
TVNZ
TVNZ – History of Television in NZ
Clip of the network ident

Television stations in New Zealand
Television channels and stations established in 1976
Television channels and stations disestablished in 1980
1976 establishments in New Zealand
1980 disestablishments in New Zealand
Defunct television channels in New Zealand